David Allan Evans (born 1940 Sioux City, Iowa) USA is an American poet. From 2002 to 2014, he was the poet laureate of the U.S. state of South Dakota.

Life
He attended college on a football scholarship and earned degrees from Morningside College, the University of Iowa, and the University of Arkansas with a M.F.A. in creative writing. 
Since 1968, Evans has taught at South Dakota State University where he is a Professor of English and a Writer-in-Residence. Evans has published five books of poetry.

Awards
He received two grants as a Fulbright Scholar to study in China, and was the first South Dakotan to receive a grant from the National Endowment for the Arts in 1974.

References

External links
Website at South Dakota State University
 Interview with a Poet: David Allan Evans

1940 births
Living people
21st-century American poets
Poets from Iowa
Poets from South Dakota
Poets Laureate of South Dakota
20th-century American poets
Morningside University alumni
University of Iowa alumni
University of Arkansas alumni
South Dakota State University faculty